Kahemba Airport  is  southeast of the city of Kahemba in Kwango Province, Democratic Republic of the Congo.

Incidents
Kahemba was the destination planned for the 1996 Air Africa crash that killed hundreds at N'Dolo Airport, Kinshasa.  The flight was reported to have been involved in the transport of arms.

See also

 Transport in the Democratic Republic of the Congo
 List of airports in the Democratic Republic of the Congo

References

External links
 FallingRain - Kahemba

 HERE Maps - Kahemba
 OpenStreetMap - Kahemba
 OurAirports - Kahemba Airport

Airports in Kwango